David Alan Fenyves (born April 29, 1960) is a Canadian former professional ice hockey defenceman who played in the National Hockey League (NHL) for the Buffalo Sabres and Philadelphia Flyers.

Playing career
Fenyves was born  in Dunnville, Ontario. He went undrafted following his junior hockey career with the Peterborough Petes of the Ontario Hockey League, where he compiled 85 points and 250 penalty minutes in 191 games and was part of their Memorial Cup championship team in 1979.  Fenyves signed with the Buffalo Sabres entering the 1980–1981 season and spent most of the next four seasons with their AHL affiliate, the Rochester Americans.

Fenyves became a full-time NHL'er during the 1984/85 season, playing in 107 games and notching 16 points in the next two seasons with the Sabres.  Fenyves returned to Rochester for the 1986–1987 season, where he helped the Americans to the Calder Cup championship.  During the playoff run, Fenyves compiled 15 points in 18 games and was awarded the Jack A. Butterfield Trophy as the playoffs' Most Valuable Player.

The following season, Fenyves signed with the Philadelphia Flyers, where he spent the majority of the next six seasons with their AHL affiliate, the Hershey Bears before retiring after the 1992–1993 season.  Following the 1987–88 and 1988–89 seasons, Fenyves was awarded the Eddie Shore Award as the AHL's best defenceman, as voted on by the AHL media and players.

For his career, Fenyves played in 206 National Hockey League games (148 with the Buffalo Sabres and 58 with the Philadelphia Flyers), totaling 35 points and 119 penalty minutes, and appeared in 11 games with the Buffalo Sabres in the NHL playoffs.

In 2004, Fenyves was inducted into the Rochester Americans Hall of Fame.

In 2017, "Fenway" was inducted into the sixth class of the Hershey Bears Hall of Fame.

Awards
Jack A. Butterfield Trophy (most valuable player in Calder Cup (American Hockey League) playoffs): 1986–87 season 
Eddie Shore Award (best defenceman in the AHL): 1987–88 
Eddie Shore Award (best defenceman in the AHL): 1988–89

Career statistics

Regular season and playoffs

International

References

External links
 

1960 births
Buffalo Sabres players
Canadian ice hockey defencemen
Hershey Bears players
Living people
Sportspeople from Haldimand County
Peterborough Petes (ice hockey) players
Philadelphia Flyers players
Rochester Americans players
Undrafted National Hockey League players